Tanamarina Sakay is a town and commune in Madagascar. It belongs to the district of Ikalamavony, which is a part of Haute Matsiatra Region. The population of the commune was estimated to be approximately 9,235 in 2018.

References and notes 

Populated places in Haute Matsiatra